Indian Lake is a freshwater lake located in Sugar Camp, Oneida County, Wisconsin, United States.

In 1950, the Wisconsin state record Smallmouth bass was caught in Indian Lake.

External links
Indian Lake at Lake-Link.com

References

Lakes of Oneida County, Wisconsin